Joël van Kaam (born 8 March 2002) is a Dutch professional footballer who plays as a right-back for the Under-21 squad of Groningen.

Career
On 31 August 2021, Van Kaam joined Emmen on loan for the 2021–22 season alongside fellow Groningen-player Kian Slor.

Personal life
Van Kaam was born in the Netherlands to a Dutch father and Brazilian mother. Van Kaam is the younger brother of Daniël van Kaam.

Career statistics

Club

Notes

References

2002 births
Living people
Dutch footballers
Netherlands youth international footballers
Dutch people of Brazilian descent
Association football fullbacks
FC Groningen players
FC Emmen players
Eredivisie players
Eerste Divisie players
Footballers from Groningen (province)
People from Delfzijl